Bartłomiej Ciepiela (born 24 May 2001) is a Polish professional footballer who plays as a midfielder for Ekstraklasa side Stal Mielec, on loan from Legia Warsaw. Besides Legia, he has played for Igloopol Dębica juniors, Legia Warsaw II and Stal Stalowa Wola.

Club career

Early years
Ciepiela began his career at Igloopol Dębica juniors in 2010. He played for Legia Warsaw's youth teams from 2016 to 2018. In 2019, he was transferred to their senior reserves in the III liga. Ciepiela made his debut for Legia II on 2 June 2019 in the 6–1 away defeat at Lechia Tomaszów Mazowiecki.

Stal Stalowa Wola
On 24 July 2019, it was announced that the II liga team Stal Stalowa Wola had signed Ciepiela on a one-year loan deal from Legia. Ciepiela made his debut for his new club on 17 August 2017 in a league encounter against Bytovia Bytów. The match ended in the 4–1 defeat for Stal, as he was substituted on for Robert Dadok in the 76th minute. Ciepiela played 29 games, netting 3 goals, for Stal in 2019–20 as the team finished in 15th position, resulting in the club's relegation to the III liga.

Legia Warsaw
On 29 August 2021, he made his Ekstraklasa debut for Legia, in the 1–0 defeat at Wisła Kraków. On 7 December 2021, his contract was extended to 30 June 2024.

Stal Mielec
On 20 June 2022, Ciepiela moved on a one-year loan to another Ekstraklasa side Stal Mielec.

References

External links
 
 Bartłomiej Ciepiela – UEFA competition record

2001 births
Living people
Sportspeople from Tarnów
Polish footballers
Association football midfielders
III liga players
II liga players
Ekstraklasa players
Igloopol Dębica players
Legia Warsaw players
Legia Warsaw II players
Stal Stalowa Wola players
Stal Mielec players